William Merritt Chase Homestead is a historic home located at Shinnecock Hills in Suffolk County, New York.

History
It was built as a residence and studio for artist William Merritt Chase (1849–1916) in 1892 by the prominent architectural firm of McKim, Mead, and White.  It is a -story frame structure sheathed in wood shingles that have weathered to a muted, sun-bleached brown.  Four gable dormers and three eyebrow windows (added in 1917) project from the gambrel roof.  A rear laundry room, porch, and bathroom were added in 1920.  Also on the property is a 1-story wood-frame barn.

The house was the subject of one of Chase's own paintings in 1893. It was added to the National Register of Historic Places in 1983.

References

External links
1893 Painting of the Chase Homestead

Houses on the National Register of Historic Places in New York (state)
Houses completed in 1892
Houses in Suffolk County, New York
National Register of Historic Places in Suffolk County, New York